Silulu A'etonu (born March 19, 1984, in Guam) is an American Samoan judoka, who played for the half-middleweight category. A'etonu represented American Samoa at the 2008 Summer Olympics in Beijing, where she competed for the women's half-middleweight class (63 kg). She lost the first preliminary match to Germany's Anna von Harnier, who successfully scored an ippon and a kuchiki taoshi (single leg takedown), at eight seconds. A'etonu was also the nation's flag bearer at the opening ceremony.

References

External links
 
NBC 2008 Olympics profile

American people of Samoan descent
American Samoan female judoka
Guamanian female judoka
Living people
Olympic judoka of American Samoa
Judoka at the 2008 Summer Olympics
1984 births
21st-century American women